Charles Bourgeois (July 29, 1879 – May 15, 1940) was a politician in the Quebec, Canada. He served as a Member of Parliament and as a Senator.

Early life

He was born on July 29, 1879 in Trois-Rivières, Mauricie. He was an attorney.

Member of Parliament

He ran as a Conservative candidate to the House of Commons of Canada in 1926 in the district of Nicolet but lost. He won a seat in the district of Three Rivers and St. Maurice in a 1931 by-election, but did not run for re-election in 1935.

Senator

In 1935, Bourgeois was appointed to the Canadian Senate on the advice of Prime Minister Richard Bedford Bennett and served until his death. He represented the division of Shawinegan.

Death

He died in office on May 15, 1940.

Footnotes

1879 births
1940 deaths
Canadian senators from Quebec
Conservative Party of Canada (1867–1942) MPs
Conservative Party of Canada (1867–1942) senators
Members of the House of Commons of Canada from Quebec
People from Trois-Rivières